Charles L. Flynn Jr. was appointed President at the College of Mount Saint Vincent in 2000. Prior to the College of Mount Saint Vincent, Flynn served as Provost of Assumption College in Massachusetts.

He received a bachelor's degree from Hamilton College and a M.A. and the Ph.D. in history from Duke University. A member of Phi Beta Kappa, Flynn is a respected scholar and author; his works include "White Land, Black Labor: Caste and Class in Late Nineteenth-Century Georgia" and his co-edited book "Race, Class, and Politics in Southern History," which was named an outstanding book on human rights by the Gustavus Myers Center in 1990. In 1999 he was initiated into Omicron Delta Kappa while at Assumption.

Flynn retired and was named President Emeritus of the College of Mount Saint Vincent in 2021.

References

Year of birth missing (living people)
Duke University alumni
Hamilton College (New York) alumni
Living people
Assumption College faculty